South Dublin, a division of County Dublin, was a county constituency in Ireland from 1885 to 1922. It elected one Member of Parliament (MP) to the House of Commons of the Parliament of the United Kingdom, using the first past the post voting system.

Prior to the 1885 general election the area was part of the Dublin County constituency. From 1918 to 1921, it was also used as a constituency for Dáil Éireann. From the dissolution of 1922, shortly before the establishment of the Irish Free State, the area was not represented in the UK Parliament.

Boundaries
From 1885 to 1918, South Dublin was defined as:

This constituency comprised the south-eastern part of County Dublin, as a strip along the coast south of the city of Dublin to the county boundary. The constituency was bounded by the city of Dublin to the north, North Dublin to the west, East Wicklow to the south and the sea to the east. It included Dalkey, Kingstown, Blackrock, Stillorgan, Glencullen.

From 1918 to 1922, South Dublin was defined as:

History
Prior to the 1885 general election, the county was the undivided two-member Dublin County constituency. Under the Redistribution of Seats Act 1885, the county was divided into two single-member divisions of North Dublin and South Dublin. Under the Redistribution of Seats (Ireland) Act 1918, the parliamentary representation of the administrative county was increased from two to four divisions. South Dublin was extended to the west, with the creation of two new divisions of Pembroke and Rathmines.

At the general elections of 1885 and 1886, the Irish Parliamentary Party candidate gained a majority of the votes cast. At the general elections of 1892, 1895, 1900, 1906 and January 1910, Unionist candidates gained a majority of the votes cast, although in 1900 the Unionist vote was split and the Irish Parliamentary Party candidate was elected. In January 1910, the Unionist majority fell to 66, and in December 1910, the Irish Parliamentary Party candidate was returned with a majority of 133. 'The unionists had held on to the ... seat with the help of loyal upper and middle-class Catholics. When the seat eventually fell to the nationalists in the second election of 1910 the successful candidate was William Cotton, a leading figure in the business community whose patriotism was broad enough to allow him to support motions for loyal addresses to the monarch at Dublin Corporation meetings ... many nationalists were suspicious of Cotton's conservative views' At a by-election in July 1917, the Irish Parliamentary Party candidate was returned unopposed. Following a redrawing of boundaries, the seat was won by the Sinn Féin candidate at the general election of 1918.

At the 1918 general election, Sinn Féin issued an election manifesto in which it called for a "establishment of a constituent assembly comprising persons chosen by Irish constituencies". After the election, Sinn Féin invited all those elected for Irish constistuencies to sit as members of Dáil Éireann, termed Teachta Dála (or TD, known in English as a Deputy). In practice, only those elected for Sinn Féin attended. This included George Gavan Duffy, elected for South Dublin.

Under the Government of Ireland Act 1920, the area was combined with the North Dublin, Pembroke and Rathmines Divisions to form Dublin County, a 6-seat constituency for the Southern Ireland House of Commons and a two-seat constituency at Westminster. Sinn Féin treated the 1921 election for the Southern Ireland House of Commons as part of the election to the Second Dáil. The six seats were won uncontested by Sinn Féin. Gavan Duffy was one of the six TDs for Dublin County.

Under s. 1(4) of the Irish Free State (Agreement) Act 1922, no writ was to be issued "for a constituency in Ireland other than a constituency in Northern Ireland". Therefore, no vote was held in Dublin County at the 1922 United Kingdom general election on 15 November 1922, shortly before the Irish Free State left the United Kingdom on 6 December 1922.

Members of Parliament

Elections

Elections in the 1910s
{{Election box begin | title=1918 general election: South Dublin <ref>General Election: 14 December 1918 – Dublin South, ElectionsIreland.org</ref>}}

 Death of Cotton''

Elections in the 1900s

Elections in the 1890s

Elections in the 1880s

References

External links
 Dáil Éireann Members Database Office of the Houses of the Oireachtas
 Dublin Historic Maps: Parliamentary & Dail Constituencies 1780–1969 (a work in progress)

Westminster constituencies in County Dublin (historic)
Dáil constituencies in County Dublin (historic)
Constituencies of the Parliament of the United Kingdom established in 1885
Constituencies of the Parliament of the United Kingdom disestablished in 1922